Francis Lorne (30 March 1889, Falkirk – June 1963 Harare) was a Scottish architect and partner of the prominent Sir John Burnet, Tait & Lorne architectural firm.

References

1889 births
1963 deaths
Scottish architects